Högsäter is a locality situated in Färgelanda Municipality, Västra Götaland County, Sweden. It had 705 inhabitants in 2010.

References 

Populated places in Västra Götaland County
Populated places in Färgelanda Municipality
Dalsland